Ricardo Silvio Caputo (1949 – October 1, 1997) was an Argentine American serial killer during the 1970s who was known as "The Lady Killer". Caputo was born in 1949 in Mendoza, Argentina. In 1970, he moved to the United States and settled in New York City. According to his brother Alberto, Caputo was physically and sexually abused as a child.

Though he was not definitively linked to any murders after 1977, he remained a fugitive throughout the 1980s, and finally surrendered to police in 1994.

Incarcerated at Attica State Prison in New York, Caputo had a fatal heart attack in October 1997, at the age of 48.

Victims 
 Nathalie Brown, 19, Flower Hill, New York (1971) (he was declared mentally incompetent to stand trial at the time, then escaped from Manhattan Psychiatric Center on Wards Island)
 Judith Becker, 26, Yonkers, New York (1974)
 Barbara Ann Taylor, 28, San Francisco (1975)
 Laura Gomez, Mexico City (1977)

Suspected victims 
 Devon Green, 23, Los Angeles (1981) - Caputo became a suspect in Green's death when a former coworker of hers spotted him on a crime show and identified Caputo as having worked at a Los Angeles restaurant where Green was a chef. Already imprisoned at the time this information came to light in 1994, Caputo was neither charged with nor admitted to her murder. 
 Jacqueline Bernard, 64, New York City (1983) - Caputo was a suspect in this murder but was never charged. A friend of the victim's, Linda Wolfe, published a book called Love Me to Death in 1998 in which she conjected that Caputo was Bernard's killer.

See also 
 List of serial killers in the United States

References 

1949 births
1971 murders in the United States
1997 deaths
20th-century criminals
American escapees
American people who died in prison custody
American serial killers
Argentine emigrants to the United States
Criminals from New York City
Criminals of the San Francisco Bay Area
Date of birth missing
FBI Ten Most Wanted Fugitives
Male serial killers
People declared mentally unfit for court
People from Mendoza, Argentina
Prisoners who died in New York (state) detention
Serial killers who died in prison custody